The 1908 Spring Hill Badgers football team represented Spring Hill College as an independent during the 1908 college football season.

Schedule

References

Spring Hill
Spring Hill Badgers football seasons
College football undefeated seasons
Spring Hill Badgers football